St. Luke's Episcopal Church is a parish of the Episcopal Church located in Hot Springs, Arkansas, in the Diocese of Arkansas. The congregation was established in 1866; its present interim Priest is Fr. Darrell Stayton.

It is noted for its historic parish church located at Spring and Cottage Streets, completed in 1926 to replace the previous structure, which had been destroyed by a tornado. The church is a stone Gothic Revival building designed by Thompson and Harding. Its gable-roofed nave is dominated by a massive buttressed stone tower at the front, topped by a tall parapet. A stained glass window is set in the tower, just above the projecting gable-roofed entrance vestibule. It was listed on the National Register of Historic Places in 1982.

See also
National Register of Historic Places listings in Garland County, Arkansas

References

External links
St. Luke's web site

Episcopal church buildings in Arkansas
Churches on the National Register of Historic Places in Arkansas
Gothic Revival church buildings in Arkansas
Churches completed in 1925
Churches in Garland County, Arkansas
Buildings and structures in Hot Springs, Arkansas
National Register of Historic Places in Hot Springs, Arkansas